Walmart shooting may refer to:
2014 Las Vegas shootings, near a Walmart Supercenter in Las Vegas, Nevada
2017 Thornton shooting, at a Walmart Supercenter in Thornton, Colorado
2019 El Paso shooting, at a Walmart Supercenter in El Paso, Texas
2022 Chesapeake shooting, at a Walmart Supercenter in Chesapeake, Virginia

See also 
Criticism of Walmart